Yesterday Was Dramatic – Today Is OK is the debut studio album by Icelandic band Múm. It was released on 23 December 1999 by TMT Entertainment.

Critical reception and legacy

Reviewing Yesterday Was Dramatic – Today Is OK for AllMusic, Tim DiGravina found the music "effortlessly timeless and thoroughly engrossing" and called the album "an unmitigated, accessible masterpiece." Matt LeMay of Pitchfork deemed it "one of the most deeply, purely emotionally affecting albums of the year."

In 2005, Múm performed Yesterday Was Dramatic – Today Is OK live in its entirety as part of the All Tomorrow's Parties-curated Don't Look Back concert series. On 30 August 2019, Morr Music released a 20th anniversary remastered edition of the album, which included remixes and reinterpretations of the album's songs as bonus tracks.

Track listing
All tracks are written by Örvar Þóreyjarson Smárason, Gunnar Örn Tynes, Gyða Valtýsdóttir and Kristín Anna Valtýsdóttir.

Personnel
Credits are adapted from the album's liner notes.

Additional musicians
 Helga Björg Arnardóttir – clarinet on "There Is a Number of Small Things" and "Awake on a Train"
 Sigríður Geirsdóttir – strings on "Awake on a Train"
 Hildur Guðnadóttir – strings on "Awake on a Train"
 Stefán Már Magnússon – guitar on "Awake on a Train"
 Eiríkur Orri Ólafsson – trumpet on "Awake on a Train"
 Gróa Margrét Valdimarsdóttir – strings on "Awake on a Train"

Production
 Finnur Björnsson – mixing, recording
 Finnur Hákonarson – recording
 Múm – mixing, recording

Design
 Arnaldur Hilmisson – artwork
 Múm – artwork

Release history

References

External links
 
 

1999 debut albums
Múm albums